Indiahoma is a town in Comanche County, Oklahoma, United States. It is located just south of US Route 62, about 24.4 driving miles west of Lawton.

The population was 344 at the 2010 census.  It is included as an exurb in the Lawton, Oklahoma, Metropolitan Statistical Area. It is also home to the Treasure Lake Job Corp.

Geography
The Geographic Names Information System (GNIS) locates Indiahoma at 34.6197940°N 98.7514573°W (34°37'11"N 98°45'05"W).

Demographics

At the 2010 census, there were 344 people, 145 households, and 97 families in the town. The racial makeup of the town was 64.0% White, 27.9% Native American, 0.3% Asian, 1.5% from other races, and 6.4% from two or more races. Hispanic or Latino of any race were 11.9% of the population.

Of the 145 households 22.8% had children under the age of 18 living with them, 42.1% were married couples living together, 16.6% had a female householder with no husband present, and 33.1% were non-families. 27.6% of households were one person and 13.1% were one person aged 65 or older. The average household size was 2.37 and the average family size was 2.82.

The age distribution was 20.3% under the age of 18, 8.7% from 18 to 24, 21.8% from 25 to 44, 35.8% from 45 to 64, and 13.4% 65 or older. The median age was 44.4 years. For every 100 females, there were 98.8 males. For every 100 females age 18 and over, there were 87.7 males.

According to the 2000 census, the median household income was $21,071, and the median family income  was $28,977. Males had a median income of $27,250 versus $19,063 for females. The per capita income for the town was $10,153. About 22.9% of families and 29.6% of the population were below the poverty line, including 33.6% of those under age 18 and 25.5% of those age 65 or over.

References

External links
 Encyclopedia of Oklahoma History and Culture - Indiahoma

Towns in Comanche County, Oklahoma
Towns in Oklahoma